Filip Almström-Tähti (born 22 June 1991) is a Swedish football defender. He plays for FC Stockholm Internazionale in Ettan Norra.

References

1991 births
Living people
Swedish people of Finnish descent
Swedish footballers
Association football defenders
Huddinge IF players
IK Frej players
Notodden FK players
Örgryte IS players
Västerås SK Fotboll players
IFK Mariehamn players
Ettan Fotboll players
Superettan players
Norwegian Second Division players
Veikkausliiga players
Swedish expatriate footballers
Expatriate footballers in Norway
Swedish expatriate sportspeople in Norway
Expatriate footballers in Finland
Swedish expatriate sportspeople in Finland